The Land of Jazz is a 1920 American silent comedy film produced and distributed by Fox Film Corporation. Directed by Jules Furthman and written by Barbara La Marr, it starred Eileen Percy and Ruth Stonehouse.

Cast
Eileen Percy as Nina Dumbarton
Ruth Stonehouse as Nancy Lee
Herbert Heyes as Dr. Vane Carruthers
George Fisher as Captain De Dortain
Franklyn Farnum (Undetermined Role)
Hayward Mack (Undetermined Role)
Rose Dione as Mrs. Lord
Carrie Clark Ward as Mrs. Dunkinson (credited as Carry Ward)
Blanche Payson as The Maid
Clarence Wilson (Undetermined Role) (credited as Wilson Hummel)
Harry Dunkinson as Mr. Dumbardon
Dick La Reno (Undetermined Role)

Preservation status
The Land of Jazz is now considered to be a lost film.

See also
1937 Fox vault fire

References

External links

 

Lantern glass slide

1920 films
American silent feature films
Lost American films
Films with screenplays by Barbara La Marr
1920 comedy films
Lost musical comedy films
Fox Film films
American black-and-white films
1920s musical comedy films
1920s American films
Silent American comedy films
1920s English-language films